The traditional cuisine of Abruzzo is eclectic, drawing on pastoral, mountain, and coastal cuisine. Staples of Abruzzo cuisine include bread, pasta, meat, fish, cheese, and wine. The isolation which has characterized the region for decades has ensured the independence of its culinary tradition from those of nearby regions. Local cuisine was widely appreciated in a 2013 survey among foreign tourists.

Ingredients

Abruzzese cuisine is known for the following ingredients:
Saffron of l'Aquila, cultivated primarily in Navelli and L'Aquila 
 Olive oil produced in Colline Teramane (the Teramo hills), marked by the quality level DOP and considered some of Italy's best
Liquorice of Atri, primarily produced in Abruzzo
 Lamb and sheep, especially in the mountains. Sheep's milk (or ricotta) is an important source of Abruzzese cheese, and sheep intestines are used as sausage casing or for stuffed meat rolls. Mountain goat meat is also occasionally consumed in Abruzzo.
 Truffles and mushrooms, particularly wild mushrooms from the forests and hills 
 Red Sulmona Garlic, typical zone red garlic
 Rosemary
 Diavoletto d'Abruzzo, hot chili pepper or peperoncini, regionally known as diavolilli, is common in Abruzzese cuisine and often used to add spice to dishes.
 Vegetables such as lentils, grasspeas and other legumes; artichoke, eggplant, and cauliflower
 Fish in the coast zone and lakes.

Dishes

Starters

Abruzzese starters include:
 Bruschetta: bread spread with salt and oil, sausage, or vegetables such as tomato or zucchini with mozzarella
 Antipasto di fegatini: appetizer from Teramo consisting of chicken livers, onion, peppers, vinegar, sugar, dry wine, pepper, salt and oil
 Mussels of Vasto: mussels stuffed with a mixture of breadcrumbs, garlic and parsley, olive oil, lemon juice, and tomato sauce
 Mussels with saffron: steamed mussels prepared with parsley, onion, bay leaf, white wine, olive oil, and saffron sauce
 Baccalà or salt cod: cod cooked in a pan with potatoes, tomatoes, oil, garlic, parsley, onion, red pepper, salt, and black olives
 Sauce all'aquilana: beef marrow with saffron, eggs, cream and butter
Ancient Abruzzo sauce: it is a sauce made with parsley, basil, sage, celery, rosemary, carrots and salt; it is used as a condiment for meats, roasts, sauces and soups.
Orange appetizer: they are slices of oranges with anchovy fillets, extra-virgin olive oil and salt.
Spur anchovies: anchovies fried with flour, eggs, oil, white vinegar, parsley and salt.
Cazzimperio: Abruzzo version of the classic pinzimonio with caciocavallo cheese, whole milk, butter, egg yolks, flour, salt, pepper, slices of stale bread.
Pizza con le sfrigole: it is a white pizza with mass dough, lard, salt and precisely the "sfrigole", or the crunchy flakes of fat and connective tissues that remained in the pan when lard was once prepared at home.
Sulmona garlic-flavoured bruschetta: classic bruschetta spread with garlic, salt and oil.
Liver sausage bruschetta: classic bruschetta with liver sausages, homemade bread, oil and salt to taste.
Marinara appetizer: mixed fish appetizer with squid, clams and scampi dressed with a sauce made up of anchovies, tuna, capers, vinegar, garlic, and parsley.
Crostini alla chietina: homemade triangular slices of bread dipped in beaten egg and fried in a pan, preferably with olive oil, garnished with anchovies, capers and butter.
L'Aquila sauce: mixture of ox marrow with saffron from Abruzzo, eggs, cooking cream, butter.
Baked chickpea croquettes: these are croquettes made with chickpeas, water, tomato, carrots, chilli pepper, bay leaf, onion, garlic, salt, chopped parsley and oil.

Pasta

Popular pasta dishes are:

maccheroni alla chitarra. The pasta is prepared by pressing dough through a chitarra, creating long, thin noodles similar to spaghetti. It is served with a tomato-based sauce, often flavored with peppers, pork, goose or lamb 
sagne e fagioli (flavored with tomatoes, garlic, oil, and peperoncini). 
gnocchi carrati, flavored with bacon and pecorino cheese
pastuccia (polenta with sausage, eggs, and cheese) 
Maccheroni alla molinara: are an uneven type of thick, hand-made spaghetti, 4-6mm, using just flour, semolina and water
Fettuccine all'abruzzese: pasta with bacon, pecorino and Parmesan
Amatriciana sauce: it is a condiment originating from the Amatrice area which until 1927 was included in the province of L'Aquila, which subsequently became a typical dish of Roman cuisine. To date amatriciana is widespread throughout the Sabine area of Abruzzo and especially in L'Aquila and Cicolano. The main ingredients are bacon, pecorino and tomato; the onion is not used much, frequent instead in the Roman version.
Rintrocele o Rintrocilo o i'ntrucioloni: Rintrocele is a long pasta (poor dough without eggs, only durum wheat and water) typical of the Lanciano area. Generally it is made with sheep's sauce or with the typical lamb sauce.
Pasta allo sparone: Sparone in dialect means rag; in fact this fresh pasta (filled with spinach, ricotta and grated cheese) is cooked all wrapped up in a white cloth. After boiling, the sparone is removed and the pasta is cut into rounds and seasoned with tomato sauce, then browned in the oven.
Maltagliati or tajulini: Pasta to be accompanied, for example, with bean soup.
Pasta alla mugnaia: egg pasta resulting from a mix of flours, which is characterized by its elongated and irregular shape and particular consistency, usually seasoned with a very rich meat sauce. It is typical of Elice where the homonymous festival is also celebrated every year.

Sagne e fagioli (fasciule): Pasta made with water, salt and flour, with a characteristic strip shape, accompanied by a tomato sauce and very moist beans.
Ceppe: Homemade pasta. It is formed from egg-free dough, and has the characteristic shape obtained by passing a strip of dough about 3-4 centimeters long and 1 centimeter wide around a log. It is excellent with wild boar meat ragout. Typical of the Civitella del Tronto area, in the Teramo area.
Polenta all'abruzzese: Fry the bacon with the sausages and the onion, add a little salt and brown everything. Pour the tomato and cook for about 1 hour. Put a large saucepan on the fire, with water in the ratio of one cup of milk per person, and drop a drizzle of olive oil into it. When it is about to boil, drop the cornmeal in rain, taking care to mix continuously with the other hand to avoid the formation of lumps. Once it reaches a certain consistency, continue to cook the polenta, stirring constantly. A "good" polenta needs about 20 minutes of cooking. To see if the polenta is cooked, put half a spoonful of it on a plate, let it cool and if, lifting part of it with a fork, it detaches from the plate, it means that the polenta is cooked. Turn it upside down on a work surface and level it with a wooden spoon, then dress it with the sauce and plenty of grated pecorino.
Ndurciulline: This pasta is characteristic of the area crossed by the ancient L'Aquila-Foggia sheep track, also called Tratturo Magno, in the section between Lanciano and Cupello. It is a fresh handmade pasta, made from durum wheat semolina and soft wheat flour, of an opaque ivory color, cut into long thin spaghetti with a rectangular section. To be able to fully enjoy the 'ndurcciullune they must be seasoned with a sauce based on sheep (with which rolls are prepared with a filling made up of chopped aromatic herbs, garlic, parsley, pork bacon or lard) tomato pieces, extra virgin olive oil and various aromatic spices. This dish was born from the encounter between the peasant culture and the pastoral one, which took place during the transhumance.

Meat

The region features several types of roast lamb and sheep, including:
 Arrosticini: skewered lamb or sheep
 Pecora alla cottora: lamb or sheep stuffed with mountain herbs and cooked in a copper pot
 Lamb cooked whole in a bread oven
 Agnello cacio e ovo: a lamb-based fricassee
 Mazzerelle: lamb intestines stuffed with lamb, garlic, marjoram, lettuce, and spices
 Le virtù: a soup from Teramo with legumes, vegetables and pork, usually eaten in the spring at celebrations
Timballo abruzzese: lasagna-like dish with pasta sheets (scrippelle) layered with meat, vegetables and rice; often served for Christmas and Easter
 Porchetta abruzzese: moist boneless-pork roast, slow-roasted with rosemary, garlic, and pepper It was brought by Abruzzese immigrants to the northeastern United States (particularly Philadelphia), where it is known as "Italian roast pork" or "roast pork."
Turkey alla canzanese: typical dish of Canzano, a small town near Teramo, the turkey is served cold, together with the jelly obtained by letting the cooking broth rest and cool.
‘Ndocca ‘Ndocca: It is the classic poor peasant dish in which all the parts of the pig are used (ears, snout, rind, feet, ribs) which cannot become hams or cured meats. Typical of the Teramo area.
Coratella: animal entrails where parts such as heart, liver and lungs, kidneys, spleen, windpipe and sweetbreads are used

Seafood

Seafood also plays an important role in the cuisine of Abruzzo, especially areas near the coast. The main fish dishes of Abruzzo are:

Brodetti, a fish broth from Vasto, Giulianova and Pescara, is cooked in an earthenware pot and flavored with tomatoes, herbs, and peperoncino. 
 Scapece alla vastese (marinated fish) from Vasto and it is the only dish in Abruzzo to use saffron, one of the region's most important products. The fish (often skate) is cut into pieces, floured and browned in a frying pan. The vinegar-based marinade can preserve the fish for 20 to 30 days in wooden containers which are passed from generation to generation. 
Baccalà all'abruzzese is another seafood dish of region: is a cod cooked in a pan with potatoes, tomatoes, oil, garlic, parsley, onion, red pepper, salt, and black olives.
: typical fish product of Campotosto Lake, it is cooked roasted on the grill and then marinated in a preparation of vinegar and with oil and chilli pepper.

  Mussels with saffron: classic cooked mussels prepared with parsley, onion, bay leaf, white wine, olive oil and seasoned with Saffron of l'Aquila sauce.
 Marinated anchovies: they are seasoned anchovies marinated with garlic, parsley, oregano, lemon, oil, salt, pepper.
 Marinara appetizer: mixed fish appetizer with squid, clams and scampi seasoned with a sauce composed of anchovies, tuna, capers, vinegar, garlic, and parsley.
 Raw squid: typical of Pescara, they are squid boiled in vinegar, and then seasoned with chopped garlic sauce, extra virgin olive oil, lemon juice, salt and hot pepper.
Vastese-style mussels: stuffed mussels with a mixture of breadcrumbs, minced garlic and parsley, oil, a few drops of lemon and a little tomato sauce.
Appetizer alla giuliese: mixed fish with minced garlic, parsley, lemon juice, oil and salt and green sauce made with tuna, anchovies, capers, green peppers, oil and vinegar.
  Crudo di calamaretti: typical of Pescara, they are baby squid boiled in vinegar, and then seasoned with minced garlic sauce, extra virgin olive oil, lemon juice, salt and hot pepper.
  Marinara appetizer: mixed fish appetizer with squid, clams and scampi seasoned with a sauce composed of anchovies, tuna, capers, vinegar, garlic, and parsley.
  Crostini alla chietina: homemade triangular slices of bread dipped in beaten egg and fried in a pan, preferably with olive oil garnished with anchovies, capers and butter.
  Marinated anchovies: they are seasoned anchovies marinated with garlic, parsley, oregano, lemon, oil, salt, pepper.
  Pasta with Scampi or Paste nghe l'Aragustine: Typical dish of the stretch of coast between Pescara and Vasto. Adriatic scampi, tomato, garlic and parsley. A light sauce is prepared with which Spaghetti alla Chitarra or Rintrocilo are seasoned.
  Pasta alla chitarra con i Pelosi: Another dish of Abruzzo's seafood cuisine made with large hairy crabs (genus Pilumnus hirtellus) found on the cliffs between Pescara and Vasto. The almost disappearance of these crabs has prohibited their capture, but they can still be tasted in some restaurants on the coast (if you know the cook). The shell is browned in oil and the peeled tomatoes are poured.

Breads and pizzas

 Pane di mais (cornbread): primarily loaves and oval, an Easter variant adds boiled potatoes, olive oil, eggs and milk.
 Bread of Senator Cappelli: primarily in the province of Chieti, it has made a comeback.
 Bread ear, named for its ear-like appearance
 Scrippelle: a rustic pancake-like dish from Teramo, similar to a French-style crêpe and served  (in broth) or part of a soufflé with ragù and stuffed with chicken liver, meatballs, hard-boiled eggs, and cheese
Pane parruozzo
Pane casareccio aquilano
Pane con le patate
Pane di Solina, pagnotte di Solina
Pane nobile di Guardiagrele
Panonta: It is mainly composed of bread greased with bacon frying oil (as an alternative to bacon you can use pork cheek), melted lard or lard, or fried golden brown (with egg) and with cod, flamed with wine white or sometimes with vinegar (the recipe varies from town to town).

Rustic pizzas are also common:
 Easter Pizza (Pizza di Pasqua), a rustic pizza with cheese and pepper from the Teramo area
 Pizza fritta, shallow-fried pizza
 Fiadoni from Chieti: a dough of risen eggs and cheese, baked in a thin pastry shell
 Pizza scima

Salumi
Salumi (singular salume) is an Italian term describing the preparation of cured meat products made predominantly from pork.

Spreadable sausage flavored with nutmeg and liver sausage with garlic and spices are hallmarks of Teramo cuisine. Ventricina from the Vasto area is made with large pieces of fat and lean pork, pressed and seasoned with powdered sweet peppers and fennel and encased in dried pig stomach. 

Mortadella di Campotosto (well known in Abruzzo) is an oval, dark-red mortadella with a white column of fat. They are generally sold in pairs, tied together. Another name for the mortadella is coglioni di mulo (donkey's balls). It is made from shoulder and loin meat, prosciutto trimmings and fat. It is 80 percent lean meat; 25 percent is prosciutto (ham), and 20 percent is pancetta. The meat is minced and mixed with salt, pepper and white wine.

Other salumi of this region are:
Aquila salami
Abruzzo salami
Annoia
Horseshoe-shaped liver salami in grape syrup - Salamella di fegato al vino cotto
Teramo Nnuje salami - Nnuje teramana
Soppressata charcuterie
Frentano sausage - Salsicciotto frentano
Pennapiedimonte sausage
Prosciuttello salami
Cured Pork (lonza)
Curedpork head (Coppa di testa)
Pork sausage preserved in oli or lard- Salsiccia di maiale sott’olio o sotto strutto
Teramo Ventricina charchuterie - Ventricina teramana

Cheeses
The region's principal cheeses are:
 White cow cheese, a soft cheese made from cow's milk
 Caciocavallo abruzzese, a soft, slightly elastic dairy product made from raw, whole cow's milk with rennet and salt
 Caciofiore Aquilano, made from raw whole sheep's milk, rennet, artichokes and saffron (which gives it its characteristic yellow color)
 Caciotta vaccination frentana, a half-cooked, semi-hard cheese made from raw whole cow's milk, rennet and salt
 Canestrato of Castel del Monte, a hard cheese made from raw whole sheep's milk, with rennet and salt

 Caprino abruzzese, made from raw whole goat milk (sometimes with sheep's milk), curd, and salt
 Cheese and curd stazzo, cheese and byproducts obtained from the processing of raw milk from sheep, cattle and goats
 Junket vaccination or Abruzzo sprisciocca, a soft fresh cheese made from raw whole cow's milk, rennet, and salt
 Pecorino d'Abruzzo: one of Abruzzo's flagship products—a mild, semi-hard (or hard) cheese with holes, made from raw whole sheep's milk, rennet, and salt
 Pecorino di Atri, a compact, semi-cooked cheese made from sheep's milk, rennet and salt
 Pecorino di Farindola, cheese made from sheep's milk and pork rennet (a special type of rennet, made by filling a dried pork stomach with vinegar and white wine for forty days)
 Ricotta, made from the remnants of the coagulation of raw whole sheep's milk, heated after filtration
 Scamorza d'Abruzzo, a stretched curd cheese made from cow's milk, rennet (liquid or powder) and salt

Atri and Rivisondoli are known for their cheeses. Mozzarella (fresh or seasoned) is typically made from ewe's milk; many lesser-known cheeses are found throughout Abruzzo and Molise.

Desserts and sweets

Abruzzo's sweets are well-known:
 Confetti di Sulmona: sugar-coated almonds from Sulmona
 Torrone Nurzia: chocolate nougat from L'Aquila
 Parrozzo: a cake-like treat made from crushed almonds and coated in chocolate
 Pizzelle (also known as ferratelle): a waffle cookie, often flavored with anise
 Croccante, a type of nougat made from almonds and caramelized sugar, often flavored with lemon
 Calgionetti, cagionetti, caggiunitti, caviciunette: Christmas fritters, sometimes filled with chestnuts or chickpeas and flavored with chocolate or cocoa
 Bocconotti: stuffed sweets often served for Christmas
 Zeppole di San Giuseppe: fried or baked pastries made for Saint Joseph's Day
 Sise delle monache, two layers of sponge cake filled with custard, produced in the town of Guardiagrele in the province of Chieti

Fruits
The region's principal fruits are:

 : coastal citrus (particularly oranges), used for jam and limoncello
  and : types of chestnut
 : a local cherry
 : almonds from the town of Navelli
 : apples from the region
 : table grapes, also used for jam

Olive oil
 

The use of oil in regional mountain and sea dishes is important; among the most common oil products we find the Aprutino Pescarese, the Pretuziano delle Colline Teramane, l'Olio extra vergine di oliva delle Valli Aquilane and Colline Teatine.

The list of Abruzzo olive cultivars:

 Castiglionese
 Dritta 
 Gentile di Chieti
 Intosso
 Monicella
 Carpinetana
 Morella 
 Nebbio di Chieti
 Raja 
 Toccolana
 Tortiglione
 Crognalegna
 Gentile del L'Aquila (Rusticana del L'Aquila)

Wines and liquors
 
Renowned wines like Montepulciano DOCG, Trebbiano d'Abruzzo DOC and Controguerra DOC are judged to be amongst the world's finest. In 2012, a bottle of Trebbiano d'Abruzzo ranked No. 1 in the top 50 Italian wine awards.

The region's principal wines are:
Montepulciano d'Abruzzo (red)
Cerasuolo d'Abruzzo
 Trebbiano d'Abruzzo, the region's wine white. In 2012, Trebbiano d'Abruzzo topped 50 Italian wines. Other wines are Montonico, Pecorino, Passerina, and Controguerra.

Liqueurs include:
Genziana liqueur, a liqueur made from gentian root
Centerba, an aromatic liqueur made from infused herbs
Aurum: brandy-based Pescara liquor with a 40-percent alcohol content, infused with oranges
Ratafià, black-cherry liqueur and wine (primarily Montepulciano d'Abruzzo)
Amaro Abruzzese, made of herbs, roots, and an infusion of fresh citrus fruits

IGT wines are Alto Tirino, Colli Aprutini, Colli del Sangro, Colline Frentane, Colline Pescaresi, Colline Teatine, Del Vastese (or Histonium), Terre di Chieti, and Valle Peligna.

See also
 Italian cuisine

References

Further reading
Teresa, Anna. "Food and Memories of Abruzzo: Italy's Pastoral Land" (Wiley, 2004)

 
Abruzzo
Italian cuisine
European cuisine